Paizeis? (Greek: Παίζεις?) is the second album by the popular Greek-American artist Kalomira that was released on November 29, 2005 by Heaven Music.

Track listing
 "Ki Olo Perimeno" (Music & Lyrics: Giannis Stigas) – 3:55
 "Tora" (Music: Harry K, Lyrics: Elias Philippou) – 3:47
 "Einai Vradies" (Music: Harry K, Lyrics: Elias Philippou) – 3:03
 "Paizeis?" (Music: Konstantinos Pantzis, Lyrics: Kaiti Bony) – 3:20
 "Mystiko" (Music: Konstantinos Pantzis, Lyrics: Giannis Liontos) – 2:54
 "Ta Party Mou Ragizoun Tin Kardia" (Music & Lyrics: Giannis Stigas) – 3:02
 "Kleise Ta Matia Sou" (Music: Konstantinos Pantzis, Lyrics: Giannis Liontos) – 2:52
 "Ena Ki Ena" (Music & Lyrics: Giannis Stigas) – 3:00
 "Nyhtes Fotias" (Music: Kostas Celeste, Lyrics: Elias Philippou) – 3:03
 "Mia Zoi" (Music: Konstantinos Pantzis, Lyrics: Tereza) – 4:47
 "Rock U Love U" (ft Bo) (Music & Lyrics: Kalomira) – 3:19
 "Just Want You To Want Me" (Music & Lyrics: Kalomira) – 4:05

Singles
"Paizeis?"
On November 25, 2005 the first single "Paizeis" was released from the album. In addition to the production of a music video, promotional puzzles were given out with από 25 Νοεμβρίου θα παίζουμε (On November 25, we will play) written on them to inform the public of the date of the single's release.

"Ki Olo Perimeno"
The second single "Ki Olo Perimeno" was released in March 2006 along with a music video of its own.

Chart performance

References

2005 albums
Greek-language albums
Heaven Music albums
Kalomira albums